The fourth season of the American television musical drama series Nashville, created by Callie Khouri, premiered on September 23, 2015, on ABC and concluded on May 25, 2016. The show features an ensemble cast with Connie Britton and Hayden Panettiere in the leading roles as two country music superstars, Rayna Jaymes and Juliette Barnes. The season consisted of 21 episodes and was the last season to air on ABC before the series moved to CMT.

As with season three, the episodes are named after songs from a variety of country artists, including Lucinda Williams ("Can't Let Go"), Conway Twitty ("'Til The Pain Outwears The Shame"), Waylon Jennings ("Stop the World (And Let Me Off)"), Patty Loveless ("How Can I Help You Say Goodbye"), Reba McEntire ("How Does It Feel To Be Free") and LeAnn Rimes ("What I Cannot Change").

Production
On  May 7, 2015, Nashville was renewed for a fourth season by ABC. The writers began work on the season on May 26, 2015. This season will receive a $10 million incentive package from the state of Tennessee, and other local groups, more than the Season 3 incentives — which totaled $8 million. Filming began on July 17, 2015. The third episode was shot on August 7, 2015. Filming for Season 4 was completed on April 4, 2016.

Cast

The third season was the last to feature Eric Close as a series regular; he will no longer appear in the show as a main cast member. On July 25, 2015 Riley Smith was cast as Markus Keen, for a season long arc. Keen will be the newest Highway 65 artist, and Rayna promises to help him strip down his sound. When he realizes how much the label needs his album to be a hit, he begins to control Rayna. On October 13, 2015, it was announced that Hayden Panettiere would be temporarily leaving the series to receive treatment for post-partum depression; at the time she had completed seven episodes. Panettiere returned to the set on January 8, 2016 to begin work on the fourteenth episode.

Regular
 Connie Britton as Rayna Jaymes
 Hayden Panettiere as Juliette Barnes
 Charles Esten as Deacon Claybourne
 Clare Bowen as Scarlett O'Connor
 Sam Palladio as Gunnar Scott
 Jonathan Jackson as Avery Barkley
 Chris Carmack as Will Lexington
 Will Chase as Luke Wheeler
 Lennon Stella as Maddie Conrad
 Maisy Stella as Daphne Conrad
 Aubrey Peeples as Layla Grant

Recurring
 Nick Jandl as Dr. Caleb Rand
 David Alford as Bucky Dawes
 Ed Amatrudo as Glenn Goodman
 Andi Rayne and Nora Gill as Cadence Barkley
 Riley Smith as Markus Keen
 Kourtney Hansen as Emily
 Cynthia McWilliams as Gabriella Manning
 Scott Reeves as Noel Laughlin
 Michael Lowry as Kenneth Devine
 Keean Johnson as Colt Wheeler
 Kyle Dean Massey as Kevin Bicks
 Oliver Hudson as Jeff Fordham
 Scout Taylor-Compton as Erin
 Katie Callaway as Luke's Intern Christel
 Jessy Schram as Cash Gray
 Derek Hough as Noah West
 Mark Collie as Frankie

Guest
Dana Wheeler-Nicholson as Beverly O'Connor
Eric Close as Teddy Conrad
Chaley Rose as Zoey Dalton
Steven Tyler as himself
Kelly Ripa as herself
Michael Strahan as himself
Keann Johnson as himself
Jay DeMarcus as himself
Jim Lauderdale as himself
Kelsea Ballerini as herself
Mario Lopez as himself
Charissa Thompson as herself
Kesha as herself
Alicia Witt as Autumn Chase
Thomas Rhett as himself
Robin Roberts as herself
Elton John as himself
Whoopi Goldberg as herself
Joy Behar as herself
Raven-Symoné as herself
Paula Faris as herself
Deborah Roberts as herself

Episodes

U.S. ratings

References

External links
 
 

Season 4
2015 American television seasons
2016 American television seasons